Agenesis of the corpus callosum (ACC) is a rare birth defect in which there is a complete or partial absence of the corpus callosum. It occurs when the development of the corpus callosum, the band of white matter connecting the two hemispheres in the brain, in the embryo is disrupted. The result of this is that the fibers that would otherwise form the corpus callosum are instead longitudinally oriented along the ipsilateral ventricular wall and form structures called Probst bundles.

In addition to agenesis, other degrees of callosal defects exist, including hypoplasia (underdevelopment or thinness), hypogenesis (partial agenesis) or dysgenesis (malformation).

ACC is found in many syndromes and can often present alongside hypoplasia of the cerebellar vermis. When this is the case, there can also be an enlarged fourth ventricle or hydrocephalus; this is called Dandy–Walker malformation.

Signs and symptoms

Signs and symptoms of ACC and other callosal disorders vary greatly among individuals. However, some characteristics common in individuals with callosal disorders include vision impairments, low muscle tone (hypotonia), poor motor coordination, delays in motor milestones such as sitting and walking, delayed toilet training and dysautonomic symptoms such as low perception of pain or chewing and swallowing difficulties.

Laboratory research has demonstrated that individuals with ACC have difficulty transferring more complex information from one hemisphere to the other. They also have been shown to have some cognitive disabilities (difficulty in complex problem solving) and social difficulties (missing subtle social cues), even when their intelligence quotient is normal. Recent research suggests that specific social difficulties may be a result of impaired face processing. The unusual social behavior in childhood often resembles that of an autism spectrum disorder.

Other characteristics sometimes associated with callosal disorders include seizures, spasticity, early feeding difficulties and/or gastric reflux, hearing impairments, abnormal head and facial features, and intellectual disability.

Associated brain anomalies 
Brain anomalies that can sometimes occur in syndromes that cause callosal disorders include:
 Aplasia of the cerebellar vermis
 Chiari malformation
 Colpocephaly
 Dandy–Walker syndrome
 Holoprosencephaly
 Hydrocephalus
 Neuronal migration disorders such as grey matter heterotopia
 Schizencephaly

Associated syndromes and conditions
Some syndromes that frequently include ACC are:
 Acrocallosal syndrome
 Aicardi syndrome
 Andermann syndrome
 Donnai–Barrow syndrome
 Dwarfism
 FG syndrome
 L1CAM syndrome
 Microcephalic osteodysplastic primordial dwarfism type II
 Mowat–Wilson syndrome
 Oculocerebrocutaneous syndrome
 Saal Bulas syndrome
 Septo-optic dysplasia (optic nerve hypoplasia)
 Shapiro syndrome
 Vici syndrome

Some conditions that can sometimes be associated with ACC or other callosal disorders include:
 1p36 deletion syndrome
 13q deletion syndrome
 CDK13-related disorder
 Craniofacial abnormalities and other oral and maxillofacial pathologies
 Fetal alcohol syndrome
 Fetal warfarin syndrome
 Genitopatellar syndrome
 Gomez-Lopez-Hernandez syndrome
 Joubert syndrome
 Lujan–Fryns syndrome
 Marden–Walker syndrome
 Maternal nutritional deficiencies or infections
 Metabolic disorders
 Okamoto syndrome
 Opitz G/BBB syndrome
 Pascual-Castroviejo syndrome
 Pitt–Hopkins syndrome
 Sensenbrenner syndrome
 Strømme syndrome
 Triploid syndrome
 Trisomy 9
 Xia-Gibbs syndrome

Causes
Agenesis of the corpus callosum is caused by disruption to development of the fetal brain between the 3rd and 12th weeks of pregnancy. In most cases, it is not possible to know what caused an individual to have ACC or another callosal disorder. However, research suggests that some possible causes may include chromosome errors, inherited genetic factors, prenatal infections or injuries, prenatal toxic exposures, structural blockage by cysts or other brain abnormalities and metabolic disorders.

Ciliopathies: rare genetic disorders
Until recently, the medical literature did not indicate a connection among many genetic disorders, both genetic syndromes and genetic diseases, that are now being found to be related. As a result of new genetic research, some of these are, in fact, highly related in their root cause despite the widely varying symptoms apparent on clinical examination. Agenesis of the corpus callosum is one such disease, part of an emerging class of diseases called ciliopathies. The underlying cause may be a dysfunctional molecular mechanism in the primary cilia structures of the cell organelles that are present in many cellular types throughout the human body. The cilia defects adversely affect "numerous critical developmental signaling pathways" essential to cellular development and thus offer a plausible hypothesis for the often multi-symptom nature of a large set of syndromes and diseases. Known ciliopathies include primary ciliary dyskinesia, Bardet–Biedl syndrome, polycystic kidney and liver disease, nephronophthisis, Alström syndrome, Meckel–Gruber syndrome and some forms of retinal degeneration.

Cocaine and other street drugs
In utero exposure to cocaine, heroin, amphetamines and phenylpropanolamine can lead to agenesis of corpus callosum.

Diagnosis
Callosal disorders can be diagnosed through brain imaging studies or during autopsy. They may be diagnosed through an MRI, CT scan, Sonography, prenatal ultrasound, or prenatal MRI.

Treatment
There are currently no specific medical treatments for callosal disorders, but individuals with ACC and other callosal disorders may benefit from a range of developmental therapies, educational support, and services. It is important to consult with a variety of medical, health, educational, and social work professionals. Such professionals include neurologists, neuropsychologists, occupational therapists, physical therapists, speech and language pathologists, pediatricians, recreation therapists, music therapists, geneticists, social workers, special educators, early childhood intervention specialists, and caregivers for adults.

Prognosis
Prognosis varies depending on the type of callosal abnormality and associated conditions or syndromes. It is not possible for the corpus callosum to regenerate. Neuropsychological testing reveals subtle differences in higher cortical function compared to individuals of the same age and education without ACC,
although some individuals with callosal disorders have average intelligence and live normal lives.

Culture
Kim Peek, inspiration for the film Rain Man and renowned for his savant abilities, was born with agenesis of the corpus callosum, along with macrocephaly and damage to the cerebellum.

Notes

External links 

Congenital disorders of nervous system
Corpus callosum